Acacia trinalis is a shrub or tree of the genus Acacia and the subgenus Plurinerves that is endemic to an area of south western Australia.

Description
The angular and resin-ribbed branchlets have easily detached minute stipules with a triangular shape. Like most species of Acacia it has phyllodes rather than true leaves. It blooms in September and produces yellow flowers. The simple inflorescences occur in pairs in the axils and have spherical flower-heads with a diameter of  containing 22 to 28 golden coloured flowers.

Distribution
It is native to an area in the Wheatbelt region of Western Australia where it is commonly situated in swampy areas, around salt lakes and on flats growing in sandy or clay-loam soils. The range of the species extends from around Marchagee in the north west down to the Mortlock River near Goomalling in the south east.

See also
List of Acacia species

References

trinalis
Acacias of Western Australia
Taxa named by Bruce Maslin
Taxa named by Richard Sumner Cowan
Plants described in 1999